is a Japanese footballer currently playing as a goalkeeper for Tokyo United.

Career statistics

Club
.

Notes

References

External links

1995 births
Living people
Association football people from Tokyo
Japanese footballers
Association football goalkeepers
J3 League players
Japan Football League players
YSCC Yokohama players
Tokyo United FC players
Tokyo Musashino United FC players